Zielone  is a village in the administrative district of Gmina Krasnobród, within Zamość County, Lublin Voivodeship, in eastern Poland.

The village has a population of 470.

References

Zielone